Jolly Bus was an English bus company operating in Sunderland from 1923 until 1995.

History
In July 1923, WH Jolly commenced operated a service from South Hylton to Sunderland. Following the closure of the railway it was extended from the outskirts of Sunderland into the city centre.

The Jolly Bus ran from Claxheugh Road (map) in South Hylton to Evesham (map) and Sunderland city centre (map).

The Jolly Bus trademark features were both the colour, cream with a brown stripe, and the rear seat, made of varnished wooden slats.  WH Jolly also ran a small number of coaches.

Pressure from other services after deregulation, coupled with the announcement of the Tyne & Wear Metro extension to Sunderland and South Hylton caused the company to cease operations on 1 July 1995.

After the company closed the buses were sold to other companies. It is believed Duple Dominant bodied Bedford YMT KTY 23X was sold to Emsworth & District before being donated to Asia Bus Response, as a response to the Tsunami Disaster of 26 December 2004.

Duple Dominant bodied Bedford YMTs BGR 683W and BGR 684W were sold to Minsterley Motors, the latter operated until at least 2006 as a school bus for Mary Webb School and Science College in Pontesbury. It has since been preserved.

References

External links
Stuart's World Buses gallery
Sunderland District Omnibuses Buses Sunderland Antiquartians Society

1923 establishments in England
1995 disestablishments in England
Former bus operators in Tyne and Wear